The Futsal-Regionalliga is the first tier of futsal in the German futsal league system.

History of the Futsal-Regionalliga

The Futsal-Regionalliga West was introduced in 2005 with nine teams and UFC Münster were crowned the first champions. The NOFV-Pelada-Futsal-Liga was introduced in the 2013–14 season with seven teams and the Futsal-Regionalliga Süd in the 2015–16 season with seven teams.

Currently, there are three leagues which are the highest of four divisions in German futsal:

 Futsal-Regionalliga Nord, (8 teams covering the states of Bremen, Hamburg, Lower Saxony and Schleswig-Holstein)

Futsal-Regionalliga West, (10 teams covering the state of North Rhine-Westphalia)
Futsal-Regionalliga Nordost, (12 teams in 2 groups covering parts of Eastern Germany)
Futsal-Regionalliga Süd, (10 teams covering the states of Bavaria, Hessia and Baden-Württemberg)
Futsal Regionalliga Südwest, (5 teams covering the states of Saarland and Rhineland-Palatinate)

League setup

Promotion
The champions of each division take part in the Playoffs for the Promotion to the Futsal Bundesliga.

Relegation
The bottom teams of each division are relegated directly or compete in a relegation playoff round.

Champions

2015–

References

External links
Futsal-Regionalliga Süd on Fussball.de 
Regionalliga results and league table on Sueddeutscher Fussballverband 
Futsal-Regionalliga West on Fussball.de 
Futsal-Regionalliga Nordost on FuPa.net 

Futsal leagues in Germany
Ger